Thomas Hall (5 August 1619 – 28 September 1667) was an English politician who sat in the House of Commons at various times between 1654 and 1660.
 
In 1654, Hall was elected Member of Parliament for Lincolnshire in the First Protectorate Parliament and was re-elected MP for Lincolnshire in 1656 for the Second Protectorate Parliament. He was appointed assessment commissioner for Worcester in 1656.

In 1660, Hall was elected MP for  Worcester in the Convention Parliament. He was appointed J.P. on  10 July 1660.
 
Hall died at the age of 48.

References

1619 births
1667 deaths
Politicians from Lincolnshire
Members of the Parliament of England for Worcester
Place of birth missing
English MPs 1654–1655
English MPs 1656–1658
English MPs 1660